Matteo Tomei (born 28 June 1984) is an Italian footballer who plays for Brian Lignano.

Biography

Serie D
Born in Motta di Livenza, Veneto region, Tomei was a youth product of Venetian club Padova. From 2003 to 2005 Tomei was a goalkeeper for two Serie D clubs.

Triestina
On 10 July 2005 he was signed by Julian Venetian club Triestina in a 5-year contract. Tomei appeared as an unused bench for Triestina in 2005–06 Serie B. On 31 January 2007 Tomei was signed by Ross County of the First Division of Scottish Football League.

In 2008, he was signed by Italian Lega Pro Seconda Divisione club Isola Liri.

Return to Serie D
In summer 2010 he was signed by Union Quinto. In summer 2011 he left for SandonàJesolo.

Serie C
In summer 2013 he was signed by Real Vicenza. Tomei participated in the training camp held by Associazione Italiana Calciatori for those without a club.

Real Vicenza avoided from relegation back to Serie D in 2014, but was expelled from 2015–16 Lega Pro due to financial stress test.

On 26 July 2015 Tomei was signed by Pordenone.

On 22 September 2020, he joined Juve Stabia on a two-year contract.

On 1 February 2021 he signed a 2.5-year contract with Ravenna.

On 28 October 2021 he joined amateur side Brian Lignano.

References

External links
 
 Associazione Italiana Calciatori profile (data by football.it) 
 

Italian footballers
Calcio Padova players
A.C. Sambonifacese players
A.S.D. Itala San Marco Gradisca players
U.S. Triestina Calcio 1918 players
Ross County F.C. players
A.C. Isola Liri players
Pordenone Calcio players
Vis Pesaro dal 1898 players
S.S. Teramo Calcio players
S.S. Juve Stabia players
Ravenna F.C. players
Serie C players
Scottish Football League players
Association football goalkeepers
Italian expatriate sportspeople in Scotland
Expatriate footballers in Scotland
People from Motta di Livenza
Sportspeople from the Province of Treviso
1984 births
Living people
Footballers from Veneto